Linke is a German surname deriving from the German word meaning "left".  It can refer to:

Political party
 Left (Austria),(), a political party in Austria.
 The Left (Germany),, a political party in Germany.

People
 Armin Linke, Italian artist
 Bronisław Linke, Polish painter
 Carsten Linke, German football player
 Ed Linke, American baseball player
 Erika C. Linke, associate dean, Carnegie Mellon University Hunt Library
 Heiner Linke, physics professor at Lund University
 Kai Linke, German artist
 Mariusz Linke, Polish-German professional grappler and mixed martial arts fighter
 Paul Linke, American actor
 Sebastjan Linke, Slovenian slalom canoer 
 Susanne Linke, German choreographer
 Thomas Linke, German football player
 Uli Linke, American anthropologist

German-language surnames

da:Linke
it:Linke